Raymond Lauchengco (born November 29, 1964) is a Filipino actor, artist, and singer with roots in musical theater. His foray into showbusiness began at the age of 12 when he played the role of Louis, son of Anna, in the Repertory Philippines staging of The King and I.

Career
Lauchengco went on to join mainstream Philippine showbusiness at the age of 18, cementing his reputation as one of the hottest teen idols of the 1980s when he appeared as one of five young male leads in the hugely popular film, Bagets.

Lauchengco was the Philippine representative to the prestigious Tokyo Music Festival in 1987 and has performed in both solo and group concerts in over 25 countries. He is the recipient of the Aliw Award for Best Concert Collaboration for the concert series, The Best of Us, with Ayen Laurel. Raymond has released seven albums, to both critical and commercial success.

On June 23, 1993, he launched the album "New Every Morning" at the Cosmo Bar, and his first album under Dyna Records.

His eighth album, The Promise, released by Viva Records, was released on May 17, 2014.

Filmography

Television
That's Entertainment (GMA Network)
Penthouse on 7 (GMA 7)
Champoy (RPN 9)
Germspesyal (GMA 7)
GMA Supershow (GMA 7)
Saturday Entertainment (GMA 7)
RSVP (GMA 7)
Dance Upon a Time (RJTV 29)
Penthouse on RJTV (RJTV 29)
ASAP Natin 'To (ABS-CBN 2)
StarStruck (GMA 7)
Wowowee (ABS-CBN 2)
Pinoy Big Brother (ABS-CBN 2)
Happy Yipee Yehey! (ABS-CBN 2)
It's Showtime (ABS-CBN 2)
MYX Live (MYX Channel)
Mellow MYX (MYX Channel)
Celebrity Duets: Philippine Edition (GMA 7)
Eat Bulaga! (RPN 9; ABS-CBN 2; GMA 7)
Maalaala Mo Kaya (ABS-CBN 2)
Sing Galing (TV5)
Magpakailanman (GMA 7)
Maynila (GMA 7)
Bagets: Just Got Lucky (TV5)
Just Duet (GMA 7)
The Ryzza Mae Show (GMA 7)
Tonight with Arnold Clavio (GTV 27)
Magandang Buhay (ABS-CBN 2, Kapamilya Channel & A2Z 11)
Tadhana (GMA 7)
Dear Uge (GMA 7)

Film
First Love (Star Cinema, ABS-CBN Films & Viva Films, 2018) – Dave
Felix Manalo Story (Viva Films, 2015) - Dominador
Of All the Things (2012) – Dan 
In Your Eyes (2010) – Ciara and Julia's father
Ten Little Indians: Part 2 (1996) – Tonton
Joey Boy Munti, 15 anyos ka sa Muntinlupa (1991)
Tiny Terrestrial: The Three Professors (1990) – Prof. Paul Cruz
Remember Me, Mama (1987)
Bagets 2 (1984) – Arnel
Hotshots (1984)- Danny
Bukas Luluhod ang mga Tala (1984) – Jun
Bagets (1984) – Arnel
Saan Darating ang Umaga? (1983) – Raul
Cross My Heart (1982) – Ryan

Discography
 Raymond (1983)
 Dreamboy (1984)
 Rated R (1988)
 Walang Kupas (1992)
 New Every Morning (1993)
 Bagong Bayani Alay Kay Flor (1995)
 SCE: Raymond Lauchengco (1998)
 Raymond Lauchengco (2005)
 Full Circle (2007)
 The Promise (2014)

Concert events
 Phil. Star article: Raymond & Menchu Lauchengco – Sibling Revelry show (Feb 2010)

Awards and nominations

References

External links
Raymond Lauchengco Official Website

1964 births
Living people
Filipino male musical theatre actors
Filipino evangelicals
20th-century Filipino male singers
That's Entertainment (Philippine TV series)
GMA Network personalities
Filipino people of Chinese descent
Radio Philippines Network personalities
Male actors from Manila
Musicians from Manila
Filipino male film actors
21st-century Filipino male singers
Filipino television variety show hosts

tl:Raymond Lauchengco